The United Daily News is a daily broadsheet newspaper in the Philippines written in the Chinese language.  As of 2008, the newspaper had a circulation of 32,000, making it the Philippines' second-largest Chinese-language newspaper in terms of circulation, after the World News.

The newspaper, the only Chinese-language newspaper that was authorized to publish during the martial law era, was founded in 1973 by Cheng Kim Tiao, merging two pre-existing Chinese-language newspapers: the Kong Li Po (公理報), founded in 1911, and the Great China Press (大中華日報), established after World War II.  Both newspapers were known to be sympathetic to the Kuomintang, with the Kong Li Po even being founded by Wu Ching-ming, Sun Yat-sen's organizer in the Philippines.  Its founding editor-in-chief, Sy Yinchow, was the world's longest-serving editor-in-chief, having served in that position at a number of publications since 1945.  Known as the "dean of Chinese media practitioners", Sy wrote daily for the newspaper until his death in 2014.

In addition to its main Chinese-language edition, the United Daily News also contained an English-language section, which later became its own newspaper called the United News.

References

External links
United Daily News website
United News, the English-language edition of the United Daily News

Chinese-language newspapers (Traditional Chinese)
Daily newspapers published in the Philippines
Newspapers published in Metro Manila